The Burkinabe ambassador in Moscow is the official representative of the Government in Ouagadougou to the Government of Russia.

List of representatives 

Burkina Faso–Russia relations

References 

 
Russia
Burkina Faso